GRB 070714B was a gamma-ray burst (GRB) that was detected on 14 July 2007 at 04:59 UTC. A gamma-ray burst is a highly luminous flash associated with an explosion in a distant galaxy and producing gamma rays, the most energetic form of electromagnetic radiation, and often followed by a longer-lived "afterglow" emitted at longer wavelengths (X-ray, ultraviolet, optical, infrared, and radio).

At a total duration of only 3 seconds, GRB 070714B was classified as a short burst, a subclass of GRBs which is believed to be caused by the merger of two neutron stars. GRB 070714B had a redshift of z = 0.92, corresponding to a distance of about 7.4 billion light years, making it the most distant short burst detected as of 2007.

Observations 
GRB 070714B was detected by the Swift Gamma-Ray Burst Mission satellite on 14 July 2007 at 04:59 UTC. The burst lasted only 3 seconds and reached its peak intensity 0.2 seconds after the initial detection. The optical afterglow was detected by the Liverpool Telescope and the William Herschel Telescope.

Distance record 
Spectroscopy of the optical afterglow and the burst's host galaxy revealed a single emission line of oxygen at a redshift of z = 0.92. This corresponds to a distance of 7.4 billion light years, making it the oldest and most distant short burst ever detected. The previous record holder had been GRB 051221A at a redshift of z = 0.546. At a redshift of z = 0.92, the total energy released by GRB 070714B (assuming isotropic emission) was approximately 1.2 ergs, which is several orders of magnitude higher than short-duration bursts with a redshift less than z = 0.5, but still significantly smaller than typical long-duration bursts.

Notes 

070714B
20070714
July 2007 events